The High Tauern (pl.;) are a mountain range on the main chain of the Central Eastern Alps, comprising the highest peaks east of the Brenner Pass. The crest forms the southern border of the Austrian states of Salzburg, Carinthia and East Tyrol, with a small part in the southwest belongs to the Italian province of South Tyrol.

In the east, the range is adjoined by the Lower Tauern. For the etymology of the name, see Tauern.

Geography
According to the Alpine Club classification of the Eastern Alps, the range is bounded by the Salzach valley to the north (separating it from the Kitzbühel Alps), the Mur valley and the Murtörl Pass to the east (separating it from the Lower Tauern), the Drava valley to the south (separating it from the Southern Limestone Alps), and the Birnlücke Pass to the west (separating it from the Zillertal Alps).

Its most important subgroups along the Alpine crest are (from West to East):

 Venediger Group (including Grossvenediger, and Lasörling)
 Granatspitze Group (Großer Muntanitz, and Granatspitze)
 Glockner Group (Grossglockner)
 Goldberg Group (Hoher Sonnblick)
 Ankogel Group (Hochalmspitze, Ankogel) and Reisseck Group (Reisseck)
The eastern end of the High Tauern is formed by the Hafner massif of the Ankogel Group, which includes the easternmost three-thousander peaks in the Alpine chain.

Further parts of the High Tauern south of the main crest of the Alps are (from West to East):
 Rieserferner Group (Hochgall)
 Villgraten Mountains (Weiße Spitze)
 Schober Group (including the Petzeck,  and Hochschober)
 Kreuzeck Group (Mölltaler Polinik)

High Tauern National Park

Along  of the main chain stretches the High Tauern National Park (Nationalpark Hohe Tauern), to which the Austrian Alpine Club as freeholder and the three states of Carinthia, Salzburg and Tyrol have contributed territory. It is divided into a core zone of  including the Grossglockner and Grossvenediger massifs, with complete prohibition of agricultural use, and a fringe zone of  used for forestry and alpine-meadow farming. Five special nature sanctuaries are protected from any human disturbance.

The park of the IUCN II category comprises the Pasterze and numerous further glaciers, the Krimml Waterfalls, several glacial valleys and alluvial fans, as well as extended tundra areas and forests. Among the flora of the Alps, especially Swiss Pines grow along the tree line; above subshrub, mainly alpenrose but also the endemic Saxifraga rudolphiana, up to nival level at about 2,800 m (9,200 ft). The fauna includes chamois, Alpine ibex and red deer, as well as griffon vulture and the golden eagle. The formerly extinct bearded vulture and the Alpine marmot have been successfully reintroduced.

The park was established according to a 1971 declaration signed by the participating states at Heiligenblut, it nevertheless took until 1981, when the first parts around Großglockner and Hochschober in Carinthia were put under protection. The adjacel finally joined in 1992. [[Touriut has become less harmful to the environment. A particular emphasis is pution and the maintenance of traditional ways of life in the Alps.

Peaks

The main peaks of the High Tauern are:

Tunnels and passes

The High Tauern are crossed by three tunnels:
Tauern Railway Tunnel between Bad Gastein and Mallnitz, finished in 1906
Katschberg Tunnel on A10 Tauern Autobahn (European route E55) leading from Sankt Michael im Lungau and the Tauern Road Tunnel to Rennweg
Felbertauerntunnel on B108 Felbertauern Straße highway, between Mittersill and Matrei in Osttirol

The best-known mountain pass road of the High Tauern is the scenic Grossglockner High Alpine Road inaugurated in 1935, including a tunnel at an elevation of  under the Hochtor Pass. East of it, the Katschberg Pass on B 99 Katschberg Straße highway parallel to the Katschberg Tunnel links Sankt Michael and Rennweg.

Beside there are numerous bridle and footpaths, in part used since ancient times:

See also

 Lärchwandschrägaufzug

References

External links

 Hohe Tauern National Park
 High Tauern on Hike.uno

Mountain ranges of the Alps
Mountain ranges of Tyrol (state)
Mountain ranges of Salzburg (state)
Mountain ranges of Carinthia (state)
 
Schober Group
Geography of East Tyrol
Protected areas of the Alps